The 1990 480 km of Nürburgring was the sixth round of the 1990 World Sportscar Championship season, taking place at Nürburgring, West Germany.  It took place on August 19, 1990.

Official results
Class winners in bold.  Cars failing to complete 75% of the winner's distance marked as Not Classified (NC).

Statistics
 Pole Position - #1 Team Sauber Mercedes - 1:20.344
 Fastest Lap - #1 Team Sauber Mercedes - 1:26.092
 Average Speed - 181.377 km/h

External links
 WSPR-Racing - 1990 Nürburgring results

Nurburgring
6 Hours of Nürburgring
Nurburgring